Mayalamari is a 1951 Indian Telugu-language fantasy film, produced by A.N.R.Gopala Krishnan under the Aswini Pictures banner and directed by P. Sridhar. It stars Akkineni Nageswara Rao and Anjali Devi, with music composed by P. Adinarayana Rao. The film was simultaneously released in Tamil as Maayakkari (1951).

Plot
Princess Indumati (Anjali Devi) the heir princess of a kingdom falls for a valiant soldier Pratap (ANR). But Indumathi's maternal uncle Bhaskar Varma (Mukkamala) aspires to possess her along with the kingdom. Meanwhile, the King (Gaadepalli) decides to unite Indu and Pratap when enraged Bhaskar kidnaps her. Pratap saves her and they move to a forest. There, Pratap tries to pluck a big fruit that hoists him into the sky and lands him in a cave of sorceress Maayalamari (C.Lakshmi Rajyam) who offers him to Goddess. Later, she makes him alive and compels him to marry her which Pratap denies. So, Maayalamari forges herself as Indu. But, Pratap recognises her and cleverly absconds. After a while when he confronts the real Indu, he rejects her out of confusion. Distressed by this Indu attempts suicide when a tribal leader Gandara Ganda (Raja Reddy) protects her and gives her shelter. This irks his lover Kuranji (Surabhi Balasaraswathi). Meanwhile, Bhaskar varma starts to search Indu and Pratap as a saint in disguise along with his associates who also dress themselves as his followers. Pratap comes across Kuranji and she silently escorts him to their hamlet to unite him with Indu. In the meanwhile, Gandara Ganda tries to molest Indu when she runs and is confronted by the disciples of Bhaskar varma. They tie Gandara Ganda to a tree and escort Indu to Bhaskar, who in the guise of a saint resides in a cottage. Bhaskar tells Indu to wait for Pratap and says they will be united. Believing him Indu stays in the cottage  waiting for the return of Kuranji and Pratap. Upon their return, Bhaskar captures them and brings them back to the palace. Bhaskar Varma proclaims death sentence to Pratap and forcibly pursuits wedlock with Indu. Gandara Ganda is saved by Kuranji and they attack the palace guards and release Pratap who kills Bhaskar Varma after a fight. The movie ends on a happy note with the marriage of Pratap & Indumathi.

Cast

Male cast
Akkineni Nageswara Rao as Pratap
Mukkamala as Bhaskar Varma
Raja Reddy as Gandara Ganda
Gaadepalli as Maharaju
 Shiva Rao
 Vangara - member of Bhagavatam Troop
Nalla Rammurthy - member of Bhagavatam Troop

Female cast
Anjali Devi as Indumathi
C.Lakshmi Rajyam as Maayalamaari
Surabhi Balasaraswathi as Kuranji
Annapurna as Maharani
Malati

Soundtrack

Music composed by P. Adinarayana Rao for both Telugu and Tamil versions. 
Telugu
Lyrics were written by Tapi Dharma Rao, P. Adinarayana Rao. Music released on Audio Company. 

Tamil
Lyrics were penned by Narasimhan and Kambadasan. Playback singers are Pithapuram Nageswara Rao, K. R. Chellamuthu, Jikki and R. Balasaraswathi Devi.

References

External links

Indian fantasy adventure films
Films based on Indian folklore
1950s fantasy adventure films